Hampe may refer to:

Surnames
Ariulf Eric Hampe (1922–2009), German rocket scientist
Asta Hampe (1907 – 2003), German engineer, physicist, and statistician
Erich Hampe (1889–1978), German soldier, editor, and author
Georg Ernst Ludwig Hampe (1795–1880), German pharmacist and botanist
Herbert Hampe (1913–1999), German Luftwaffe pilot
Karl Hampe (1869–1936), German historian of the Middle Ages
Michael Hampe (1935–2022), German theatre and opera director, general manager and actor
Roland Hampe (1908-1981), German classical archaeologist
Lloyd Hampe (1948-2021), Doctor of Veterinarian Medicine

Other names
Hampe Faustman (1919–1961), Swedish actor and film director

Places
Hampi or Hampe, a UNESCO World Heritage Site in northern Karnataka state, India

Surnames of German origin